Regulator of G-protein signaling 11 is a protein that in humans is encoded by the RGS11 gene.

The protein encoded by this gene belongs to the RGS (regulator of G protein signaling) family. Members of the RGS family act as GTPase-activating proteins on the alpha subunits of heterotrimeric, signal-transducing G proteins. This protein inhibits signal transduction by increasing the GTPase activity of G protein alpha subunits, thereby driving them into their inactive GDP-bound form. Alternative splicing occurs at this locus and two transcript variants encoding distinct isoforms have been identified.

References

Further reading